Nicholas Ioannou (born 10 November 1995) is a Cypriot professional footballer who plays as a defender for Serie B club Como and the Cyprus national team.

Club career

Youth career
Ioannou joined Manchester United youth academy at the age of 11. He played at the Marveld Tournament with the under-15 team in June 2010 held at Netherlands. This was followed by his participation in Manchester United Premier Cup. His form earned him a two-year scholarship in June 2012. But it is also reported that Manchester United was reluctant to give him a full-time contract. He made his debut in Old Trafford against Charlton Athletic in FA Youth Cup aged 16. While playing in Milk Cup, he was injured which drove him out of action for most of the 2012–13 season. In his last match for the reserves, he captained the team against Tottenham Hotspur. He also appeared in three 2013–14 UEFA Youth League group stage matches with the under-19 team.

APOEL
After being released by Manchester United, he signed a three-year contract with APOEL on 24 April 2014. On joining the club, Ioannou commented: "My main aim is to win trophies of course, but obviously I need to start playing. APOEL play in big competitions – Champions League and Europa League – so hopefully I can get a few games."

He made his official debut against Finnish club HJK on 30 July 2014, in APOEL's 2–2 away draw for the third qualifying round of the UEFA Champions League. On 5 November 2014, aged 18, he made his first UEFA Champions League group stage appearance, playing the full 90 minutes in APOEL's 0–1 defeat against Paris Saint-Germain at Parc des Princes. In his first season at APOEL, Ioannou appeared only in seven matches in all competitions, but he managed to win the double, as his team won both the Cypriot championship and the cup.

On 3 June 2016, Ioannou signed a three-year contract extension until 31 May 2019, but a few months later, on 13 March 2017, he signed a further two-year contract extension with APOEL, running until 31 May 2021. Following his successful 2016–17 season with APOEL, Ioannou awarded the "Young Player of the season" award by Cyprus Football Association.

Nottingham Forest
On 25 September 2020, Ioannou returned to England, joining EFL Championship side Nottingham Forest for an undisclosed fee. He made his debut for Forest on 3 October 2020 in a 2–1 defeat to Bristol City.

On 8 January 2021, Ioannou was loaned to Greek Super League side Aris until the end of the season.

On 5 July 2021, it was announced Ioannou had joined Serie B side Como on a season-long loan deal.

Como
On 27 July 2022, Ioannou joined Como on a permanent deal for a contact until June 2025.

International career
Being an English-Cypriot, Ioannou is eligible to represent the national teams of both the countries. In 2012, he had been capped by Cyprus U19. He made his Cyprus U21 debut on 5 September 2014, coming on as a 70th-minute substitute in a UEFA European U-21 Championship qualifying match against Belgium.

He received his first senior Cyprus national team call-up at the age of 18, being an unused substitute for Cyprus in the friendly match against Japan on 27 May 2014. He made his debut for Cyprus in 2017.

Career statistics

Club statistics

International

International goals
Scores and results list Cyprus' goal tally first.

Honours

Club
APOEL
 Cypriot First Division: 2014–15, 2015–16, 2016–17, 2017–18, 2018–19
 Cypriot Cup: 2014–15

Individual
Young player of the Season (Cyprus): 2016–17

Personal life
Ioannou's father (Demetris Ioannou) is a former Cypriot international captain. His elder brother is Michael Ioannou, who is a Cypriot youth international. He attended St George's RC High School in Walkden, Greater Manchester, during his time at the Manchester United academy.

References

External links

 APOEL official profile
 Profile at UEFA.com
 

1995 births
Living people
Sportspeople from Limassol
Cypriot footballers
Association football defenders
APOEL FC players
Nottingham Forest F.C. players
Aris Thessaloniki F.C. players
Como 1907 players
Cypriot First Division players
English Football League players
Super League Greece players
Serie B players
Cyprus youth international footballers
Cyprus international footballers
Cypriot expatriate footballers
Expatriate footballers in England
Expatriate footballers in Greece
Expatriate footballers in Italy
Cypriot expatriate sportspeople in England
Cypriot expatriate sportspeople in Greece
Cypriot expatriate sportspeople in Italy